Esther Smith is a Ghanaian gospel musician. She was born in Kumasi, Suame, Ghana in the early 70s. Esther joined the Tesano Methodist church choir at the age of 14-years-old and grew into music scene at the church.

After her secondary education, she attended Garden City Computer Training and Typing School and the School of Languages both in Kumasi, Ghana. She again joined a singing group set up by Kapital Radio a private radio station in Kumasi.

She won the award for the Gospel Album of the Year, Gospel Artiste of the Year and Best Female Vocal Performance of the Year in 2003 at the Ghana Music Awards.

Award 

 She won the Ghana Music Award for Gospel Album of the Year in 2003.

 Ghana Music Award, Gospel Artiste of the Year 2003.
 Ghana Music Award, Best Female Vocal Performance of the Year 2003.
 Ghana Music Award, Best Gospel Album of the Year 2004.
 Best Song of the Year in 2004, Ghana Music Award.
 Best Album of the Year at the 2004 Ghana Music Award.

References

External links 

 Video : Esther Smith Onyame

Year of birth missing (living people)
Living people
Ghanaian women musicians